Prapat Yoskrai (born July 30, 1993),simply known as Bank, is a Thai professional footballer who plays as a goalkeeper for Thai League 2 club Trat.

Honours

International
Thailand U-19
 AFF U-19 Youth Championship: 2011

References

1993 births
Living people
Prapat Yoskrai
Prapat Yoskrai
Association football goalkeepers
Prapat Yoskrai
Prapat Yoskrai
Prapat Yoskrai
Prapat Yoskrai